Luis Harry Waidner (November 16, 1874 in Chicago, Illinois – August 11, 1944 in Evanston, Illinois) was an American tennis player in the early 20th century.

In 1903, Waidner teamed with Kreigh Collins to reach the doubles final of the U.S. Nationals, losing to Reginald Doherty and Laurence Doherty, 7–5, 6–3, 6–3.

At the tennis tournament in Cincinnati, Waidner reached three finals: the 1904 singles final and doubles finals in 1901 and 1903. He lost the singles final to future International Tennis Hall of Famer Beals Wright, 7–5, 6–0, 6–3.

A former president of the USTA/Midwest Section, Waidner has been enshrined in the USTA/Midwest Hall of Fame. He also served as a member of the executive committee of the United States Tennis Association.

References

1874 births
1944 deaths
American male tennis players
Tennis players from Chicago